Azizi Johari is the pseudonym of an African American model and actress who featured as Playboy magazine's Playmate of the Month in June 1975.

Career
Azizi Johari was born in New York on 24 August, 1948. After some years of wandering, due to her military father's career, the family settled in Seattle, where she attended high school and college. While still in school, she and two friends formed a singing group called The Marvelles and put out a single, "Call Me Back". Later she moved to San Francisco and became a stewardess with United Airlines. She also joined the Black Arts West theatre group and had parts in A Raisin in the Sun, Black Girl and Ladies in Waiting, before gaining an unlisted part in the 1974 film McQ. 

Around this time she began using the pseudonym Azizi Johari, using the Kiswahili for "precious jewel", and asserted her African good looks on the 1973 poster Supernatural Dream. Here she is featured as sitting on the ground with her head haloed in an enormous Afro wig. Among other admirers of the poster was Sammy Davis Jr, who eventually featured Azizi in his touring show. She then made her breakthrough when she was photographed in the nude as Playmate of the Month for June 1975 and in the following year was featured kneeling naked on the sleeve of  Leon Ware's LP, Musical Massage. 

Her name and pictures now began to appear in gossip magazines aimed at African-American representation such as Jet and Players. In the latter she featured several times on the cover between 1978-80. Her 5 foot 6 inches in height and vital statistics of 36-24-37 also gained her TV appearances and small parts in a number of films between 1976-81. One of these, however, the science fiction suspense film "Assassins in Time", to which she was reported as "enlisted" in 1979, never appeared.

Filmography 
McQ (1974)
 Rocky  II (1976) as ringside girl
 The Killing of a Chinese Bookie (1976) as Rachel
 Dreamer (1979) as Lady, a travelling pool hustler
 Seed of Innocence (a.k.a. Teen Mothers, 1980) as Denise
 Exit Sunset Boulevard (1980)
 Body and Soul (1981) as Pussy Willow

TV
 The Six Million Dollar Man, episode "Clark Templeton O'Flaherty" (1975) as Girl 
 The Richard Pryor Show, featured as  "Blueberry"(1977)
 Redd Foxx TV Special (1977)

See also 
 List of people in Playboy 1970–1979

References

External links 
 

1970s Playboy Playmates
African-American Playboy Playmates
African-American female models
1948 births
Living people
Actresses from Seattle
20th-century African-American people
20th-century African-American women